Astrid Rødmyr (born 30 March 1940) is a Norwegian orienteering competitor and World champion. She won a gold medal in the 1968 World Orienteering Championships with the Norwegian Relay team, and placed 10th in the individual contest. She received a bronze medal in the relay in the 1970 World Orienteering Championships.

References

1940 births
Living people
Norwegian orienteers
Female orienteers
Foot orienteers
World Orienteering Championships medalists
20th-century Norwegian women